The 1944 Brighton by-election was held on 3 February 1944.  The byelection was held due to the resignation  of the incumbent Conservative MP, Sir Cooper Rawson.  It was won by the Conservative candidate William Teeling.

Bruce Dutton Briant stood as a National Independent. He claimed to be a supporter of the National Government but was repudiated by Winston Churchill.

References

1944 elections in the United Kingdom
By-elections to the Parliament of the United Kingdom in East Sussex constituencies
Politics of Brighton and Hove
1944 in England
20th century in Sussex